In a fiber optic cable, a buffer is one type of component used to encapsulate one or more optical fibers for the purpose of providing such functions as mechanical isolation, protection from physical damage and fiber identification.

The buffer may take the form of a miniature conduit, contained within the cable and called a "loose buffer", or "loose buffer tube". A loose buffer may contain more than one fiber, and sometimes contains a lubricating gel. A "tight buffer" consists of a polymer coating in intimate contact with the primary coating applied to the fiber during manufacture.

Buffer application methods include spraying, dipping, extrusion and electrostatic methods. Materials used to create buffers can include fluoropolymers such as polyvinylidene fluoride (Kynar), polytetrafluoroethylene (Teflon), or polyurethane.

See also
Core (optical fiber)
Cladding (optical fiber)

References

Fiber optics